The men's 100m butterfly events at the 2020 World Para Swimming European Championships were held at the Penteada Olympic Pools Complex.

Medalists

Results

S8

S9

S10

S11

S12

S13
Heats

Final

S14

References

2020 World Para Swimming European Championships